NK Đakovo was a Croatian football club based in the town of Đakovo.

In June 2012, NK Đakovo merged with its city rivals Croatia Đakovo to form HNK Đakovo Croatia.

Football clubs in Croatia
Football clubs in Osijek-Baranja County
Association football clubs established in 1962
1962 establishments in Croatia
Sport in Đakovo